The 2006–07 Latvian Hockey League season was the 16th season of the Latvian Hockey League, the top level of ice hockey in Latvia. Six teams participated in the league, and HK Riga 2000 won the championship.

Regular season

Playoffs

External links
 Season on hockeyarchives.info

Latvian Hockey League
Latvian Hockey League seasons
Latvian